The barnacle blenny (Acanthemblemaria macrospilus) is a species of chaenopsid blenny found in coral reefs in the eastern central Pacific ocean. It can reach a maximum length of  TL. This species feeds primarily on zooplankton.

References

macrospilus
Fish of the Gulf of California
Fish of Mexican Pacific coast
barnacle blenny